The following is a list of chemistry societies:

A
 Alpha Chi Sigma (ΑΧΣ)
 American Association for Clinical Chemistry
 American Chemical Society
 American Crystallographic Association
 American Institute of Chemical Engineers (AIChE)
 American Institute of Chemists(AIC)
 American Oil Chemists' Society
 American Society of Brewing Chemists
 American Society for Mass Spectrometry
 Association of Analytical Communities (AOAC International)
 Association of Greek Chemists

B
 Belgian Society of Biochemistry and Molecular Biology
 Biochemical Society
 Brazilian Chemical Society

C
 Canadian Society for Chemical Technology (CSCT)
  Canadian Society of Clinical Chemists - (CSCC)
 Chemical Abstracts Service (CAS)
 Chemical Heritage Foundation (CHF), now the Science History Institute
 Chemical Institute of Canada (CIC)
 Chemical Society Located in Taipei (CSLT)
 Chemical Society of Japan (CSJ)
 Chemical Society of Pakistan
 Chemical Society of Peru
 Chinese-American Chemical Society
 Chinese Chemical Society (Beijing) (CCS)
 Chinese Chemical Society (Taipei) (CSLT)
 Council for Chemical Research (CCR)
 Chemical Research Society of India

D
 Danish Chemical Society

E
 The Electrochemical Society
 European Association for Chemical and Molecular Sciences

F
 Faraday Society
 Federation of European Biochemical Societies

G

 Gesellschaft Deutscher Chemiker (GDCh)

H
 Hungarian Chemical Society

I
 Indian Chemical Society
 Institute of Chemistry, Ceylon (Sri Lanka)
 Institute of Chemistry of Ireland
 Institution of Chemical Engineers (IChemE)
 International Federation of Societies of Cosmetic Chemists
 International Mass Spectrometry Foundation
 International Union of Crystallography
 International Union of Pure and Applied Chemistry (IUPAC)
 Iota Sigma Pi
 Italian Chemical Society(SCI)

J
 Japan Association for International Chemical Information
 Journal of the Chemical Society of Pakistan

K
 The Korean Chemical Society

L

N
 National Organization for the Professional Advancement of Black Chemists and Chemical Engineers
 New Zealand Institute of Chemistry
 Chemical Society of Nigeria (CSN)
 Norwegian Chemical Society

P

 Pan Africa Chemistry Network
 Pancyprian Union of Chemists
 Polish Chemical Society
 The Institute of Chemists PNG

R
 Royal Australian Chemical Institute (RACI)
 Royal Netherlands Chemical Society (KNCV)
 Royal Society of Chemistry (RSC)

S
 Société Chimique de France
 Society of Chemical Industry (SCI)
 Society of Chemical Industry (American Section)
 Society of Chemical Manufacturers and Affiliates 
 Society of Cosmetic Chemists
 Swedish Chemical Society

W
 World Association of Theoretical and Computational Chemists

References

 
Societies
Chemistry societies